Andrés Gómez Domínguez (November 30, 1913 – July 26, 1991) was a Mexican basketball player who competed in the 1936 Summer Olympics. Born in Guadalajara, Jalisco, he was part of the Mexican basketball team, which won the bronze medal. He played one match.

References

1913 births
1991 deaths
Basketball players at the 1936 Summer Olympics
Mexican men's basketball players
Olympic basketball players of Mexico
Olympic bronze medalists for Mexico
Olympic medalists in basketball
Basketball players from Jalisco
Sportspeople from Guadalajara, Jalisco
Medalists at the 1936 Summer Olympics